Bernard Hedges (10 November 1927 – 8 February 2014) was a Welsh cricketer who played for Glamorgan, making his first-class debut in 1950 and playing his last match in 1967. He played 422 first-class matches, all of them for Glamorgan.

He played most of his cricket as an opening batsman despite starting his career in the middle order. He scored 17,733 first-class runs at an average of 25.22, with 21 centuries and a highest score of 182. His best season was 1961, when he scored 2026 runs at an average of 32.15.

Hedges was the first player to score a List A century for Glamorgan, doing so in 1963 with an innings of 103 against Somerset, helping Glamorgan to victory in its first List A match.

He died at his home on 8 February 2014.

References

Further reading

External links
 
 Bernard Hedges at CricketArchive

1927 births
Welsh cricketers
Glamorgan cricketers
Sportspeople from Pontypridd
2014 deaths